David Allen (born February 9, 1978) is a gridiron football running back who played with the Jacksonville Jaguars and St. Louis Rams of the National Football League (NFL) for three seasons.  He played college football for Kansas State University, and earned All-American honors.  He was originally signed as an undrafted free agent by the Jaguars, and spent one season with the Rams.

Early life
He was born in Euless, Texas and attended Liberty High School in Liberty, Missouri.

College career
Allen attended Kansas State University, and played for the Kansas State Wildcats football team from 1996 to 1999.  He was recognized as a consensus first-team All-American as an all-purpose athlete and kick returner in 1998.  He returned seven punts for a touchdown in his college career, which tied the NCAA record in 1999.

Professional career
In three NFL season, Allen appeared in twenty-three regular season games, and compiled 506 punt return yards and 1,513 kick return yards.

After leaving the Rams, Allen was signed by the Calgary Stampeders and played seven regular season games with the team from 2005 to 2006. He filled multiple roles for the team. In addition to scoring both rushing and receiving touchdowns on the offense, Allen was a kick and punt returner for the Stampeders.

He is the BLESTO scout for the Jacksonville Jaguars.  In 2018, he was named to the Kansas Sports Hall of Fame.

References

External links
 NFL.com player page

1978 births
Living people
All-American college football players
American football running backs
Jacksonville Jaguars players
Kansas State Wildcats football players
People from Euless, Texas
People from Liberty, Missouri
St. Louis Rams players
Canadian football running backs
Canadian football return specialists
Calgary Stampeders players